Business metadata is data that adds business context to other data. It provides information authored by business people and/or used by business people.  It is in contrast to technical metadata, which is data used in the storage and structure of the data in a database or system. Technical metadata includes the database table name and column name, data type, indexes referencing the data, ETL jobs involving the data, when the data was last updated, accessed, etc.

Concept 
According to noted author and columnist Lowell Fryman, "The essence of business metadata is in reducing or eliminating the barriers of communication between human and human, as well as human and computer, so that the data conveyed from reports, information systems, or business intelligence applications can be crystal clear, can facilitate business operations, and can be leveraged for all business decision-making processes."

Dan Linstedt, creator of the data vault methodology, says business metadata "...provide[s] definition of the functionality, definition of the data, definition of the elements, and definition of how the data is used within business...business metadata includes business requirements, time-lines, business metrics, business process flows, and business terminology."

Business metadata is important because it can greatly facilitate the usefulness of the data to business people.  A simple example of business metadata is a glossary entry.  Hover functionality in an application or web form can enable a glossary definition to be shown when cursor is on a field or term.

Other examples of business metadata include annotation ability within applications.  For example, a business user may be viewing a business intelligence (BI) report and notice a trend in the data.  The user may have background knowledge as to why this trend occurs.  Some business intelligence tools enable the user to create an annotation within the report that explains the trend.  Such an annotation can enhance other users' understanding of the data.  This example is especially powerful because it is created by a business user for the use of other business people.

Examples 
Other examples of business metadata are:
 Business rules
 Data quality rules
 Valid values for reference data
 Wikis 
 Collaboration software

References 

Business terms